Trixodes obesus is a species of bristle flies in the family Tachinidae found in North America. It is the only species in the monotypic genus Trixodes.

References

Further reading
 O'Hara, James E., and D. Monty Wood (2004). "Catalogue of the Tachinidae (Diptera) of America North of Mexico". Memoirs on Entomology, International, vol. 18, 410.
 Ross H. Arnett. (2000). American Insects: A Handbook of the Insects of America North of Mexico. CRC Press.

External links
Diptera.info
Taxonomic and host catalogue of the Tachinidae of America North of Mexico

Dexiinae